FWBC may refer to:

 Fair Work Building and Construction
 Faithful Word Baptist Church, a church led by Steven L. Anderson